In probability and statistics, a nearest neighbor function, nearest neighbor distance distribution, nearest-neighbor distribution function or nearest neighbor distribution is a mathematical function that is defined in relation to mathematical objects known as point processes, which are often used as mathematical models of physical phenomena representable as randomly positioned points in time, space or both. More specifically, nearest neighbor functions are defined with respect to some point in the point process as being the probability distribution of the distance from this point to its nearest neighboring point in the same point process, hence they are used to describe the probability of another point existing within some distance of a point. A nearest neighbor function can be contrasted with a spherical contact distribution function, which is not defined in reference to some initial point but rather as the probability distribution of the radius of a sphere when it first encounters or makes contact with a point of a point process.

Nearest neighbor function are used in the study of point processes as well as the related fields of stochastic geometry and spatial statistics, which are applied in various scientific and engineering disciplines such as biology, geology, physics, and telecommunications.

Point process notation

Point processes are mathematical objects that are defined on some underlying mathematical space.

Point processes have a number of interpretations, which is reflected by the various types of point process notation.

 

and represents the point process being interpreted as a random set. Alternatively, the number of points of  located in some Borel set  is often written as:

 

which reflects a random measure interpretation for point processes. These two notations are often used in parallel or interchangeably.

Definitions

Nearest neighbor function

The nearest neighbor function, as opposed to the spherical contact distribution function, is defined in relation to some point of a point process already existing in some region of space. More precisely, for some point in the point process , the nearest neighbor function is the probability distribution of the distance from that point to the nearest or closest neighboring point.

The reference point need not be at the origin, and can be located at an arbitrary point .

Examples

Mathematical expressions of the nearest neighbor distribution only exist for a few point processes.

Poisson point process

which for the homogeneous case becomes

where  denotes the volume (or more specifically, the Lebesgue measure) of the (hyper) ball of radius . In the plane  with the reference point located at the origin, this becomes

Relationship to other functions

Spherical contact distribution function

In general, the spherical contact distribution function and the corresponding nearest neighbor function are not equal. However, these two functions are identical for Poisson point processes. In fact, this characteristic is due to a unique property of Poisson processes and their Palm distributions, which forms part of the result known as the Slivnyak–Mecke or Slivnyak's theorem.

-function

The fact that the spherical distribution function Hs(r) and nearest neighbor function Do(r) are identical for the Poisson point process can be used to statistically test if point process data appears to be that of a Poisson point process. For example, in spatial statistics the -function is defined for all  ≥ 0 as:

For a Poisson point process, the  function is simply  = 1, hence why it is used as a non-parametric test for whether data behaves as though it were from a Poisson process. It is, however, thought possible to construct non-Poisson point processes for which  = 1, but such counterexamples are viewed as somewhat 'artificial' by some and exist for other statistical tests.

More generally, -function serves as one way (others include using factorial moment measures) to measure the interaction between points in a point process.

See also
 Factorial moment
 Local feature size
 Moment measure
 Spherical contact distribution function

References

Theory of probability distributions
Spatial analysis